(January 11, 1322 – July 26, 1380) was the second of the Emperors of Northern Court, although he was the first to be supported by the Ashikaga Bakufu. According to pre-Meiji scholars, his reign spanned the years from 1336 through 1348.

Genealogy
His personal name was Yutahito (豊仁), second son of Emperor Go-Fushimi.  His mother was Neishi (寧子), the daughter of Saionji Kinhira (西園寺公衡)

Naishi: Ogimachi Sanjo Sanemi’s daughter
daughter: Jogakuin-dono (長照院; d.1422）
daughter
Naishi: Mikawa-no-kami’s daughter
son: Shuson (周尊)

Events of Kōmyō's life
In his own lifetime, Kōmyō and those around him believed that he occupied the Chrysanthemum Throne from September 20, 1336 to November 18, 1348.

When Ashikaga Takauji rebelled against Emperor Go-Daigo's Kenmu Restoration and entered Kyōto in 1336, Go-Daigo fled to Enryaku-ji on Mount Hiei.  Despite lacking the sacred treasures, Prince Yutahito was enthroned as emperor, beginning the Northern Court.  On the 12th month, 21st day, Go-Daigo escaped to Yoshino, founding the Southern Court.

On November 18, 1348, he abdicated in favor of the eldest son of his older brother, the former claimant to the throne Emperor Kōgon, who became Emperor Sukō.

In April 1352, taking advantage of the Kan'ō Disturbance, a family feud in the Ashikaga clan, the Southern Emperor Emperor Go-Murakami entered Kyoto, capturing it and carrying away Kōmyō along with Emperor Kōgon, Emperor Sukō, and the Crown Prince Tadahito.  They all ended up finally in Anau, the location of the Southern Court.

In the Shōhei Reunification, Kōmyō and his companions were placed under house arrest in Yamato Province, in what is today the village of Nishiyoshino, Yoshino District, Nara.  In 1355, returning to Kyōto, he entered a monastery.

 July 26, 1380 (Kōryaku 2, 24th day of the 6th month): The former emperor died at age 60.

Eras of Kōmyō's reign
The years of Kōmyō's reign are more specifically identified by more than one era name or nengō.

Nanboku-chō Northern court
Eras as reckoned by pretender Court (as determined by Meiji rescript)
 Kenmu (continued)
 Ryakuō
 Kōei
 Jōwa

Nanboku-chō Southern court
Eras as reckoned by legitimate Court (as determined by Meiji rescript)
 Engen
 Kōkoku
 Shōhei

Southern Court Rivals
Emperor Go-Daigo
Emperor Go-Murakami

Notes

References

 Ponsonby-Fane, Richard Arthur Brabazon. (1959).  The Imperial House of Japan. Kyoto: Ponsonby Memorial Society. OCLC 194887
 Titsingh, Isaac, ed. (1834). [Siyun-sai Rin-siyo/Hayashi Gahō, 1652], ''Nipon o daï itsi ran; ou,  Annales des empereurs du Japon.''  Paris: Oriental Translation Fund of Great Britain and Ireland.

See also
 Emperor of Japan
 List of Emperors of Japan
 Imperial cult
 Emperor Go-Kōmyō

Japanese emperors
1322 births
1380 deaths
Emperor Komyo
Emperor Komyo
Emperor Komyo
14th-century Japanese monarchs
Japanese retired emperors